Cléville is a commune in the Seine-Maritime department in the Normandy region in northern France.

Geography
The A29 autoroute passes by the village in the northern part of the commune.

Population

Places of interest
 The church of St. Benoit, dating from the eleventh century.
 Some thirteenth century walls of the old priory buildings.

See also
Communes of the Seine-Maritime department

References

Communes of Seine-Maritime